Ilyukhinite is a very rare mineral of the eudialyte group, with formula . The formula given is simplified and does not show the presence of cyclic silicate groups. Ilyukhinite is the second group representative with species-defining hydronium ion after aqualite.

References

Further reading
 Johnsen, O., Ferraris, G., Gault, R.A., Grice, D.G., Kampf, A.R., and Pekov, I.V., 2003. The nomenclature of eudialyte-group minerals. The Canadian Mineralogist 41, 785-794

Cyclosilicates
Calcium minerals
Manganese(II) minerals
Zirconium minerals
Trigonal minerals
Minerals in space group 160